Waddams may refer to:

People
 Catherine Waddams (born 1948), British economist and academic
 Stephen Waddams, Canadian jurist and law professor

Places
 Waddams Grove, Illinois
 Waddams Township, Stephenson County, Illinois